Susan Engberg (born June 12, 1940, in Dubuque, Iowa) is an American novelist and award-winning author.

Biography 
Susan Engberg is of German and Danish descent. After graduating Phi Beta Kappa from Lawrence University in Wisconsin with a degree in English, Engberg worked at the Metropolitan Museum of Art in New York, at Yale University, and as an editor for the Iowa Review.

Engberg is the author of four short story collections. Her first collection, Pastorale, was called “so good that [it] could change your life” by Russell Banks in the New York Times. She followed this up with A Stay by the River and Sarah's Laughter. Her latest collection, Above the Houses, was called "gorgeously crafted" in a review in Publishers Weekly, which added that "Engberg's quiet denouements feel wholly integral to these tales of quiet desperation."

Engberg currently lives in Milwaukee with her husband, Charles, an architect and jazz musician, and their two daughters.

Awards
Pastorale won the 1993 Banta Book Award.

References 

1940 births
Living people
Writers from Dubuque, Iowa
Writers from Milwaukee
21st-century American novelists
Lawrence University alumni
American women novelists
21st-century American women writers
21st-century American short story writers
Novelists from Iowa
Novelists from Wisconsin